
Bolinao 52 is a documentary by Vietnamese American director Duc Nguyen about the Vietnamese boat people ship that was originally stranded in the Pacific Ocean in 1988.  During their 37 days at sea, the group encountered violent storms and engine failures.  They fought their thirst and hunger and a US Navy ship reportedly refused to rescue them, forcing the boat people to starve despite resorting to cannibalism. Only 52 out of the 110 boat people survived the tragedy and were rescued by Filipino fishermen who brought them to Bolinao in the Philippines.

Bolinao 52 premiered on March 19, 2007, in San Francisco and on March 24, 2007, in San Jose at the San Francisco International Asian American Film Festival.

See also
 Boat people
 Vượt Sóng
 Vietnamese International Film Festival

External links

Archival collections

Guide to the Duc Nguyen Video Footage for Bolinao 52. Special Collections and Archives, The UC Irvine Libraries, Irvine, California.

Other
 Official Website

 Seeing 'Bolinao 52'?
 Press Articles Written About Bolinao 52
 Phim "Bolinao 52" Thảm kịch của 110 người vượt biên đi tìm tự do
 Bolinao 52 - Sự cảm thông đến từ những người còn sống
UCIspace @ the Libraries digital collection: Duc Nguyen video footage for Bolinao 52

2007 films
Vietnamese diaspora
Vietnamese documentary films
Vietnamese refugees
2007 documentary films
Vietnamese-language films
Vietnamese historical films
Documentary films about refugees
Incidents of cannibalism